The Port of Plaridel or Plaridel Port, is a seaport in Plaridel, Misamis Occidental, Philippines. It is managed by Philippine Ports Authority - Port Management Office Misamis Occidental/Ozamiz.

Passenger Lines
 Cebu - Lite Ferries
 Tagbilaran, Bohol - Lite Ferries, OceanJet
 Larena, Siquijor - Lite Ferries

Statistics

Passenger Movement

Container Traffic

Cargo Throughput

Shipcalls

References

Plaridel Port
Buildings and structures in Misamis Occidental
Transportation in Mindanao
 Misamis Occidental